The 2017 New Zealand Open Grand Prix Gold was the twelfth Grand Prix's badminton tournament of the 2017 BWF Grand Prix Gold and Grand Prix. The tournament was held at the North Shore Events Centre in Auckland, New Zealand on 1–6 August 2017 and had a total purse of $120,000. Economic Development Minister Steven Joyce announced that the government is investing $185,000 for the 2016 and 2017 season. It is originally scheduled for March this year but delayed due to the Adele live concerts coming to Auckland at that time.

Men's singles

Seeds

 Wang Tzu-Wei (final)
 Ajay Jayaram (first round)
 Jonatan Christie (second round)
 H. S. Prannoy (quarterfinals)
 Anthony Sinisuka Ginting (withdrew)
 Hsu Jen-Hao (semifinals)
 Sourabh Verma (quarterfinals)
 Pablo Abian (withdrew)
 Chong Wei Feng (third round)
 Wei Nan (third round)
 Lin Yu-hsien (semifinals)
 Ihsan Maulana Mustofa (withdrew)
 Misha Zilberman (third round)
 Liew Daren (second round)
 Kashyap Parupalli (third round)
 Siril Verma (third round)

Finals

Top half

Section 1

Section 2

Section 3

Section 4

Bottom half

Section 5

Section 6

Section 7

Section 8

Women's singles

Seeds

 Ratchanok Intanon (champion)
 Fitriani (semifinals)
 Goh Jin Wei (withdrew)
 Hanna Ramadini (semifinals)
 Saena Kawakami (final)
 Dinar Dyah Ayustine (quarterfinals)
 Lee Ying Ying (first round)
 Yulia Yosephine Susanto (second round)

Finals

Top half

Section 1

Section 2

Bottom half

Section 3

Section 4

Men's doubles

Seeds

 Chen Hung-ling / Wang Chi-lin (champion)
 Ong Yew Sin / Teo Ee Yi (final)
 Manu Attri / B. Sumeeth Reddy (withdrew)
 Satwiksairaj Rankireddy / Chirag Shetty (withdrew)
 Matthew Chau / Sawan Serasinghe (second round)
 Goh Sze Fei / Nur Izzuddin (first round)
 Liao Min-chun / Su Cheng-heng (quarterfinals)
 Arjun M.R. / Ramchandran Shlok (withdrew)

Finals

Top half

Section 1

Section 2

Bottom half

Section 3

Section 4

Women's doubles

Seeds

 Vivian Hoo Kah Mun / Woon Khe Wei (champion)
 Setyana Mapasa / Gronya Somerville (withdrew)
 Ashwini Ponnappa / N. Sikki Reddy (withdrew)
 Ayako Sakuramoto / Yukiko Takahata (final)

Finals

Top half

Section 1

Section 2

Bottom half

Section 3

Section 4

Mixed doubles

Seeds

 Pranaav Jerry Chopra / N. Sikki Reddy (withdrew)
 Hafiz Faisal / Shella Devi Aulia (first round)
 Tseng Min-hao / Hu Ling-fang (second round)
 Yogendran Khrishnan /  Prajakta Sawant (first round)
 Liao Min-chun / Chen Hsiao-huan (second round)
 Edi Subaktiar / Gloria Emanuelle Widjaja (quarterfinals)
 He Jiting / Du Yue (quarterfinals)
 Sawan Serasinghe / Setyana Mapasa (final)

Finals

Top half

Section 1

Section 2

Bottom half

Section 3

Section 4

References

External links 
 Oficial site
 Tournament Link

New Zealand Open (badminton)
BWF Grand Prix Gold and Grand Prix
New Zealand Open
New Zealand Open
Sport in Auckland